Carl Heinz Illies (1 April 1935 – 16 January 1995) was an Hamburger merchant (C. Illies & Co.) and, from 1981 to 1986, President of the Hamburg Chamber of Commerce.

Origin, education and profession 
Born in Tokyo, Illies was heir of a Hamburg merchant family as the son of Carl Jürgen Illies. His great-grandfather Carl Illies senior (1840-1910) had taken over the oldest German-Japanese trading house Louis Kniffler & Co. in 1880  founded in Nagasaki in 1859 and renamed it Carl Illies & Co.
 

In Hamburg, Illies attended the Gelehrtenschule des Johanneums, completed an apprenticeship at the Berenberg Bank after his Abitur and then studied economics in the USA. After a traineeship with an American shipping company, he joined his father's company in 1958 and took over the management in 1966. Illies expanded the activities of the trading house to selected cities in Africa and the China network with eight additional office locations. Illies died at only 59 years of age and left the company to his son Carl Michael Illies, who is now the 5th generation to run the trading house.

Honorary office 
From 1981 to 1986, he was President of the Hamburg Chamber of Commerce and from 1986 Vice-President of the Association of German Chambers of Industry and Commerce. 

The Carl-Heinz Illies scholarship at the Deutsche Stiftung Musikleben is named after him.

He also distinguished himself through numerous publications.

Further reading 
 Illies, Carl-Heinz, In Walther Killy and Rudolf Vierhaus: Deutsche Biographische Enzyklopädie. Vol. 5, Saur, Munich [etc.] 1996, p. 237.

References

External links 
 Trauer um Carl-Heinz Illies, Hamburger Abendblatt, 17 January 1995

20th-century German businesspeople
German merchants
Management occupations
1935 births
1995 deaths
People from Tokyo